Monopleura is a genus of saltwater clams, marine bivalve mollusks in the family Monopleuridae. These fossils have been dated back to the Cretaceous Period (145.5 million to 66 million years ago).

These bivalves are known as pachyodonts.

Description
The thick triangular shell in this genus is capped by a smaller dome-shaped shell. Some of the pachyodonts possessed open passageways through the shell that allowed for fluids to pass. These pachyodont bivalves were habitually sedentary and grew upright with the pointed end anchored in the substrate.

References 

Prehistoric bivalve genera
Cretaceous extinctions
Hippuritida